Big Bang is V.I.P (also known as Big Bang Second Single) is the second single album by the South Korean boy band Big Bang, released by YG Entertainment on September 28, 2006. It spawned the single "La La La".

Release
The title track "La La La", was written by all the members of the group in collaboration, with sections from the YG reality show's theme song. The style is a mix of R&B, hip-hop and pop. The release of Big Bang is V.I.P includes a VCD with music videos of songs from BigBang's first single album and self-filmed videos. BigBang won Rookie of the Month (October) for "La La La" at the Cyworld Digital Music Awards.

Track listing

Charts and sales

Monthly charts

Yearly charts

Sales

References

External links
Big Bang Official Site

BigBang (South Korean band) albums
2006 albums
YG Entertainment albums
Korean-language albums
Single albums
Albums produced by G-Dragon